Poecilus chalcites is a species of woodland ground beetle in the family Carabidae. It is found in the Caribbean, Central America, and North America.

References

 https://bugguide.net/node/view/43888/bgimage

Further reading

 
 
 
 
 

Pterostichinae
Beetles described in 1823